Epwell is a village and civil parish in the north of Oxfordshire about  west of Banbury. The 2011 Census recorded the parish population's as 285.  Epwell's toponym is believed to be derived from the Old English Eoppa's Well.

Manor
In 1279 Robert Danvers held a fee at Epwell. It was an exclave of the Hundred of Dorchester until the 18th century, when it was transferred to the Hundred of Banbury.

Parish church
The Church of England parish church of Saint Anne was originally Early English. Several of the present windows are Decorated Gothic and were added later. Next the Perpendicular Gothic bell tower was added. Two windows on the north side of the church were added late in the 16th century. The church is a Grade II* listed building.  St Anne's parish is a member of the Benefice of Wykeham, along with the parishes of Broughton, Shutford, Sibford Gower, Swalcliffe and Tadmarton.

Mills
Epwell had a watermill and a windmill. The watermill building survives: it is just east of the village and was built early in the 18th century. The windmill was a tower mill northwest of the village. It was built of stone, had patent sails and a domed cap, and last worked in 1912.

Amenities
The Chandler's Arms public house was built late in the 17th century and extended in the 19th century. The pub was controlled by the Hook Norton Brewery, but by January 2013 its freehold was offered for sale. It is now a free house.  Epwell had a parish school. It is now the village hall.

References

Sources and further reading

External links

Epwell Oxfordshire

Civil parishes in Oxfordshire
Villages in Oxfordshire